David Parenzo (born 14 February 1976) is an Italian journalist, radio and television presenter. He is mostly known for being host, together with Giuseppe Cruciani, of the Italian radio show La Zanzara.

Biography 
Great-grandson of the Garibaldino and senator Cesare Parenzo, he was born to Michela Caracciolo, teacher, and Gianni Parenzo, lawyer, like his grandfather Emanuele and great-grandfather Cesare. He comes from a Jewish family of printers from the Istrian city of Poreč who settled in Italy in the 16th century.

Television 
 Tutto quello che avreste voluto sapere sul Festival ma non-avete mai osato chiedere – (Odeon TV, 1998)
 Prima Pagina – (Telenuovo, 2000–2002)
 Orario Continuato – (Telelombardia, 2002)
 Prima Serata – (Telelombardia, 2002)
 Iceberg – (Telelombardia, 2004)
 Giudicate voi – (Telelombardia, 2006)
 In onda – (La7, 2007–2012)
 Titanic Italia – (7 Gold, 2010)
 Tutti a casa: la politica fatta dai ragazzi – (MTV Italy, 2013)
 La guerra dei mondi – (Rai3, 2013)
 Radio Belva – (Rete 4, 2013)
 Matrix – (Canale 5, 2013–2015)
 In onda – (La7, 2015)
 Fuori Onda – (La7, 2016)

References

External links 

Journalism Festival Biography

1976 births
Living people
People from Padua
Italian television journalists
Italian radio presenters
Italian television presenters

Italian people of Jewish descent